Anna Marie Lundqvist-Björk (born 21 February 1947) is a retired Swedish gymnast. She competed at the 1964, 1968 and 1972 Summer Olympics with the best individual result of 29th place on the floor in 1964.

References

1947 births
Living people
Swedish female artistic gymnasts
Olympic gymnasts of Sweden
Gymnasts at the 1964 Summer Olympics
Gymnasts at the 1968 Summer Olympics
Gymnasts at the 1972 Summer Olympics
Sportspeople from Västerås
20th-century Swedish women